Julio Andrés Borges Junyent (born 22 October 1969, in Caracas) is a Venezuelan politician and lawyer. In the late 1990s he had a TV court show called "Justicia Para Todos" on Radio Caracas Televisión. He co-founded the party Primero Justicia in 2000 together with Henrique Capriles Radonski and Leopoldo Lopez.

Political career

In the 2000 parliamentary elections, Borges was elected to the National Assembly, representing Primero Justicia and Miranda State until 2005. Primero Justicia participated in the opposition boycott of the 2005 elections, but Borges was elected again in the parliamentary elections of 2010.

Borges ran for president in the opposition primaries for the Venezuelan presidential elections of 2006, but on August 9, 2006 dropped out to support Manuel Rosales, former governor of Zulia State. Borges was involved in an incident in the National Assembly in April 2013, when violence broke out between PSUV and opposition legislators following the 2013 presidential election. According to Borges, the members of PSUV stood up at the beginning of the assembly and rushed the opposition.

Education
Borges studied law at the Andrés Bello Catholic University, graduating in 1992, and got a master's degree in philosophy at Boston College (1994) and public policy at the University of Oxford (1996). He is married, and has four children.

Arrest warrant
In 2020, the Supreme Court of Justice ordered his arrest for allegedly participating in the 2018 Caracas Attack against Nicolás Maduro. On July 13, 2020, the Attorney General's Office of the Republic issued an arrest warrant for the alleged crimes of treason, usurpation of functions and association to commit crimes, and on January 16, 2023, the attorney general of Venezuela, Tarek William Saab, announces that the Public Ministry has requested a third arrest warrant against Borges, this time for his participation in the coup attempt of April 30, 2019.

References

External links
Primero Justicia Official webpage in Venezuela

 
 

1969 births
Living people
Politicians from Caracas
Members of the National Assembly (Venezuela)
Justice First politicians
Andrés Bello Catholic University alumni
Morrissey College of Arts & Sciences alumni
Alumni of the University of Oxford
Venezuelan democracy activists
People of the Crisis in Venezuela
Speakers of the National Assembly (Venezuela)
Venezuelan exiles